Campbell County was a county of the U.S. state of Georgia from  to . It was created by the state legislature on December 20, 1828, from land taken from Fayette, Coweta, and Carroll counties, and from the half of DeKalb County which became Fulton County soon afterward. Georgia's Cherokee Land Lottery of 1832 also added to the county. The county was named for Duncan G. Campbell, one of the U.S. commissioners responsible for the Treaty of Indian Springs.

The original county seat was Campbellton. When the Atlanta & West Point Railroad began to plan its route, the town's residents said no due to noise concerns, and the tracks were laid through Fairburn instead, which flourished while Campbellton died out, and Fairburn became the county seat in 1870. The Campbell County Courthouse is listed on the National Register of Historic Places.

The northwestern half of Campbell (and a bit more of Carroll) became Douglas County in 1870, divided on October 17 at the Chattahoochee River. The remainder of Campbell County was ceded to Fulton County at the end of 1931, along with Milton County, after Campbell County went bankrupt. The legislation creating the merger was enacted on August 9, 1929, with Milton being added to the process in 1931.

Politics

References

External links
 Old Campbell County historical marker

Former counties of Georgia (U.S. state)
Douglas County, Georgia
Fulton County, Georgia
1828 establishments in Georgia (U.S. state)
Populated places established in 1828
1931 disestablishments in Georgia (U.S. state)